Sarah Atereth is an American recording artist, singer, songwriter, dancer, choreographer and producer, known for her sultry vocal style, unique lyrics and dynamic dancing.  Atereth has had five consecutive hit songs worldwide, including two No. 1 UK hits as reported by MusicWeek and DMC magazines.

Biography

Atereth was born and raised in Denver, Colorado, United States, where she performed in the local theatre scene and graduated valedictorian of her high school class. She left Denver to pursue her artistic passions in New York City. While in New York, she trained as a singer with Juilliard voice professor, Beverley Johnson and as a dancer with Fred Benjamin, the head of jazz department at Alvin Ailey American Dance Theater. Atereth is a graduate of Columbia University.

Career
Atereth's music career began when she was introduced to Chris Blackwell, (founder of Island Records and collaborator with U2, Bob Marley). Blackwell, in turn, paired her with Rick Chertoff, (producer of Cyndi Lauper's hit songs "Girls Just Wanna Have Fun", "Time After Time", and Joan Osborne's "One Of Us") who co-produced Atereth's debut album, "Beguile".

Atereth's first single, "You Wouldn't Know How", hit No. 24 on Billboard Magazine's Dance Club Play Chart and crossed over to CHR/Mainstream Radio as reported by Radio & Records Magazine. Her song, "Out of My Mind", remixed by Tony Moran, hit No. 9 on Billboard Magazine's Dance Club Play Chart and received worldwide radio play.

Atereth's "The Remixes EP" debuted at No. 1 on the UK's DMC's Mainstream Chart unseating Stevie Nicks' "Dreams" remixed by Deep Dish (band). "The Remixes EP" also hit No. 2 on DMC's Club Chart. Music Week charted Atereth's "The Remixes EP" at No. 3 on their Commercial and Upfront Club Charts.

Her third single, "Fade Away", was the No. 1 most played song on XM Satellite Radio's bpm Station.  The single was Atereth's first Top 40 Mainstream charting song as reported by Radio & Records Magazine. "Fade Away" hit No. 10 on Billboard Magazine's Dance Club Play Chart.

Atereth's fourth single "It Doesn't Take Much" hit No. 4 on Billboard Magazine's Dance Club Play Chart, No. 17 on Billboard's Magazine's Dance/Club Songs (Year End) and No. 19 on Billboard's Magazine's Dance/Mix Show Airplay hit No. 4 on Billboard Magazine's Dance Club Play Chart, No. 17 on Billboard's Magazine's Dance/Club Songs (Year End) and No. 19 on Billboard's Magazine's Dance/Mix Show Airplay. Remixers include world-famous DJ Tracy Young, who appears in the music video along with DJ Brett Hendrichsen of Masterbeat.

Atereth's fifth single "Without You", co-written with Bryan Adams hit No. 1 on Music Week’s Upfront Club Top 40 Chart. "Without You" is remixed and supported by DJs, including Tiesto, Paul Oakenfold, Steve Aoki, Solasso, Nightstylers, Felix Leitner, and Riley & Durrant.

Atereth is one of the featured artists of until.org, along with Kevin Bacon, Jessica Alba and Michael Phelps.

Atereth was nominated for Best New Artist at the Winter Music Conference IDMA awards 2005 and Best Breakthrough Artist Solo at the Winter Music Conference IDMA awards 2007. Atereth was also named Music Week's FUTURE FACE of 2012.
As a writer, Atereth has been featured in numerous publications, online magazines and articles including z!nk and Artistpreneurs.

Discography

Albums
 Beguile (2004)

Remixes and EPs
 Fade Away (The Club Remixes)
 Without You (The Remixes)
 It Doesn't Take Much (The Radio Remixes)
 UK EP (The Pop Remixes)
 Fade Away (The Radio Remixes) – EP
 Out of My Mind (The Club Remixes) – EP
 You Wouldn't Know How (The Remixes I)
 It Doesn't Take Much (The Club Remixes)
 You Wouldn't Know How (Top 40 Edit)
 You Wouldn't Know How (The Remixes II)
 Without You (The Remixes II)
 Out of My Mind (The Radio Remixes)
 UK EP (The Club Remixes)
 Global Groove – Live 3
 Party Groove: Gay Days, Vol. 3

Singles
 "You Wouldn’t Know How"
 "Out of My Mind"
 "Fade Away"
 "It Doesn’t Take Much"
 "Without You"

References

External links

Sarah Atereth on YouTube

Living people
Columbia University alumni
21st-century American women singers
Year of birth missing (living people)